Pristimantis bellona is a species of frog in the family Strabomantidae. It is endemic to Colombia where it is only known from the region of its type locality in Frontino, Antioquia, on the western slope of the Cordillera Occidental.
Its natural habitats are cloud forests and very humid forests where it is usually found on low vegetation and in leaf-litter. While part of its range is within the Las Orquídeas National Natural Park, outside the protected area it is threatened by habitat loss.

References

bellona
Amphibians of the Andes
Amphibians of Colombia
Endemic fauna of Colombia
Amphibians described in 1992
Taxonomy articles created by Polbot
Fauna of the northwestern Andean montane forests